Abronia ramirezi, Ramirez's alligator lizard, is species of arboreal alligator lizard in the family Anguidae. The species, which was described in 1994 by Campbell, is endemic to Mexico.

Etymology
The specific name, ramirezi, is in honor of Mexican herpetologist Antonio Ramirez Velazquez.

Geographic range
A. ramirezi is found in the Mexican state of Chiapas.

Habitat

Reproduction
A. ramirezi is oviparous.

References

Further reading
Campbell JA (1994). "A New Species of Elongate Abronia (Squamata: Anguidae) from Chiapas, Mexico". Herpetologica 50 (1): 1–7. (Abronia ramirezi, new species).
Johnson JD, Mata-Silva V, García Padilla E, Wilson LD (2015). "The Herpetofauna of Chiapas, Mexico: composition, distribution, and conservation". Mesoamerican Herpetology 2 (3): 272–329.
Köhler G (2008). Reptiles of Central America, 2nd Edition. Offenbach, Germany: Herpeton Verlag. 400 pp. .

Abronia
Reptiles described in 1994

Endemic reptiles of Mexico